Eva Shockey (born January 5, 1988) is a canadian author, TV personality and blogger.

Life 
Shockey was born on January 5, 1988, on Vancouver Island, Canada to hunter and outdoorsman Jim Shockey and Louise Johann. She was about twenty years old when she started hunting. Prior to that, Shockey was a competitive Latin ballroom dancer and taught dance. Shockey married former professional hockey player Tim Brent on June 20, 2015. On January 12, 2017, she had a baby girl by the name of Leni Bow Brent.

Media 
Eva Shockey is the co-host of Jim Shockey's Hunting Adventures on Outdoor Channel alongside her father, Jim Shockey.

Eva Shockey appeared on the cover of Field & Stream magazine on the May 2014 issue - making her the second woman ever to be photographed for the magazine cover, the first being Queen Elizabeth II.

In November 2014, in response to photos Shockey posted of a black bear she had shot and killed during a North Carolina hunt, she faced scrutiny and social media backlash.

Shockey also appeared in a commercial for RAM Trucks "Courage is Already Inside." The commercial featured an all-female cast mountain climbing, bow hunting, performing on stages, and surfing.

USA Today Hunt & Fish interviewed Jim and Eva Shockey for the cover story of their Summer/Fall 2015 issue. The father-daughter duo cover story highlights Eva’s journey to becoming the new face of the hunting industry; how hunting has always been central to Jim’s life; and the dynamic relationship between the two.

Shockey signed on as a Cabela's Brand Ambassador in May 2015.

She partnered with Under Armour as a UA Hunt athlete in July 2015; the partnership continued through December 2017.

Shockey has two Signature Series bows with Bowtech Archery – the BowTech Eva Shockey Signature Series Compound Bow launched in 2015 and the Mossy Oak Break-Up Country finish launched in 2016.

The Hollywood Reporter revealed its Top TV Personalities listing and Shockey made her first appearance on the 10-position chart, debuting at No. 10 in July 2017.

On August 29, 2017, she released a book titled Taking Aim: Daring to Be Different, Happier, and Healthier in the Great Outdoors.

She launched her lifestyle blog in March 2018. The blog spans topics such as: Family, Food, Fashion & Décor, Fitness, Home, and Travel & Outdoor Adventure.

In November 2018, Shockey served as the Thanksgiving marathon host of Last Man Standing on WGN America.

Shockey's Facebook Watch digital series Eva Shockey's Outdoor 101 launched in December 2018. The outdoor lifestyle digital series chronicles the adventures of Eva and her family as they traverse their adopted home state of North Carolina, sharing her favorite locations and outdoor hacks.

References

Living people
1988 births
Canadian sportswomen
Canadian hunters
Sportspeople from British Columbia
Canadian television hosts
People from Vancouver Island
Canadian women television hosts